Stephanus Petrus Erasmus Trichard (23 January 1847, Ohrigstad - October 1907, Kenya) was the son of Carolus Tregardt, and the grandson of Louis Tregardt. He took part in most campaigns against rebellious African tribes in the ZAR, as well as the storming of Amajuba in the First Boer War and the defence against the Jameson Raid. After his participation in the Second Boer War, he took part in an organised emigration to east Africa, where he died.

ZAR citizen and officer
As a young man, he participated in the ZAR's campaigns against Mapoch, the Swazis and Sekhukhune. During the people's assembly at Paardekraal, he was elected fieldcornet of Middelburg and the neighbourhood of Olifants River, and shortly afterwards takes part in the military operations at Bronkhorstspruit and Majoeba. Initially, he was commander in Middelburg, and played an active role during military expeditions against Mapoch (1883–1884), Malaboch, Modjadji and Makgoba (1894–1895).

State artilerist
Shortly after, Trichard and the Middelburg commando make an important contribution to the fight against Jameson and his fellow invaders (1896), he was promoted in 1897 to commander of the State Artillery. The post was vacant after the death of Lieutenant-Colonel Henning P. N. Pretorius (1844–1897), and Trichard's appointment was not undisputed among the officers of the State Artillery. In the same year, the State Artillery undertook the Swaziland expedition, and in 1898 action was taken against Magato. The State Artillery was already regarded as a close elite corps, thanks to his predecessor, but under Trichard it was modernized and expanded.

Second Boer War
Lieutenant-Colonel Trichard and General Piet Joubert were opposed to the building of forts around Pretoria, and Trichard in the run-up to the Second Boer War advocated a more lenient policy towards England. During the Second Boer War, he fought on the Natal front, where he was involved at Dundee and Ladysmith. Then he fell back with the Boers to the Orange Free State and was involved in the conflicts at Brandfort and later on at Donkerhoek in the ZAR.

At the battle of Dalmanutha in August 1900, he successfully demonstrated the State Artillery's capabilities, but it would also ring their unit's death bell. The cannons' usefulness in the coming war phase had come to an end and they had to be systematically destroyed. The corps was divided into different units, and in October 1900 the Transvaal Executive Board had to declare Trichard's post redundant. However, retaining his rank, he led a division of the Middelburg commando until the end of the war.

As a previously wealthy farmer from the Middelburg district, Colonel Trichard submitted a claim for damages after conclusion of peace. The £300 which was offered to him, he threw at the officer's feet. His experiences during the Second Boer War he recorded in about 110 pages.

Land seeker
Colonel Trichard's son Charles (C.J.) now considered the possibility of emigration to Madagascar, an area which had been explored years before by his grandfather Carolus. The Trichards were among a group of "bittereinders" (diehards) who attend a planning meeting in Ermelo on January 7, 1903, The six men who formed part of a delegation here for a Landseeking expedition to German East Africa to explore for settlement, had excluded the Trichards for the time being. Colonel Trichard however did join the dozen of the Great Commission, under the leadership of Piet C. Joubert, who departed from Lourenco Marques in May 1904. At Trichard's insistence, they visited Madagascar, which was also examined as a destination by the Reitz brothers and General Manie Maritz. They visited Tamatawe and Tananariwe, and received by Governor General Joseph Gallieni, who authorised them to undertake a fact-finding journey. After exploring the east coast, they decided against settling because of three reasons, namely the official status of the Catholic Church, endemic malaria and the strong oriental influences.

From Madagascar, they travelled to Dar es Salaam, where they renewed the negotiations of 1903. They received permission to view the environment of Mount Meru, and returned soon after to the Transvaal, where their plans were completed in July 1904. In 1905, Trichard and his son Charles departed together with the Piet Joubert-trek to German East Africa. He eventually settled at Nakuru in Kenya, but died there during a hunting trip in October 1907.

References

Afrikaner people
South African people of Dutch descent
South African people of Swedish descent
Boer Wars
1847 births
1907 deaths
Deaths in Kenya
People of the First Boer War
People of the Second Boer War